Anobiini is a tribe of death-watch beetles in the family Ptinidae. There are at least 6 genera and 20 described species in Anobiini.

Genera
These genera belong to the tribe Anobiini:
 Anobium Fabricius, 1775 i c g b
 Cacotemnus LeConte, 1861 g
 Hemicoelinum Español, 1971
 Hemicoelus LeConte, 1861 i c g b
 Microbregma Seidlitz, 1889 i c g b
 Platybregmus Fisher, 1934 i c g b

Data sources: i = ITIS, c = Catalogue of Life, g = GBIF, b = Bugguide.net

References

Further reading

External links

 

Anobiinae